Patrick Greene may refer to:

Patrick Greene (activist), San Antonio activist 
Patrick Greene (composer), contemporary classical musician 
J. Patrick Greene, archaeologist and museum curator 
Paddy Greene, baseball player
Paddy Greene (hurler), Irish hurler

See also
Patrick Green (disambiguation)